Science school may refer to science education in general, or
 A magnet school with a particular focus on education in science
 Science College, a United Kingdom school, part of the Specialist Schools Programme, specialising in science
 'Science School', a Grade 12 program at the Ontario Science Centre
 The sciences faculty at a university
 'School of Science', a division of the Osaka University